The Best of 1977–1988: Vol 1 is the second compilation and the first double set of greatest hits by Modus, released on Open Music in 1995.

Track listing

Official releases
 1995: Modus, 2CD, 2MC, Open Music, #0033 2312

Credits and personnel

 Ján Lehotský - lead vocal, writer, keyboards
 Marika Gombitová - lead vocal, back vocal
 Miroslav Žbirka - writer, lead vocal, chorus, electric and acoustic guitar
 Ľudovít Nosko - lead vocal
 Miro Jevčák - lead vocal
 Karol Morvay - lead vocal
 Ľuboš Stankovský - lead vocal
 Marián Greksa - lead vocal
 Pavol Hammel - lead vocal
 Ivona Novotná - lead vocal

 Peter Lipa - lead vocal
 Jozef Paulíny - lead vocal
 Kamil Peteraj - lyrics
 Alexander Karšay - lyrics
 Boris Filan - lyrics
 Ľuboš Zeman - lyrics
 Juraj Štubniak - remastering
 Juraj Lehotský - photography, design
 Lukáš Minárik - design

References

General

Specific

1995 compilation albums
Modus (band) compilation albums